Tuff Shed Incorporated is a manufacturer and installer of storage buildings and garages in the United States. The company currently operates multiple factories in multiple states. Tuff Shed carries a variety of products, ranging from small storage sheds to garages to large custom buildings, sold direct through factory outlets and through The Home Depot stores.

See also
Shed
Garage (house)

References

External links
 Official website

Companies based in Denver